Japan has competed at the Asian Games since their inception in 1951, held in New Delhi, India. The National Olympic Committee of Japan, Japanese Olympic Committee, is responsible for organizing Japan's participation in the Asian Games. The Committee was established in 1911 and recognized by the International Olympic Committee in 1912; it is also the oldest Asian National Olympic Committee. Japan has a distinguished achievement among all Asian sport teams, being the only one to have won at least 20 gold medals at every Asian Games.

Asian Games

*Red border color indicates tournament was held on home soil.

Medals by Games

Medals by sport

Medals by individual

Asian Winter Games

*Red border color indicates tournament was held on home soil.

Medals by Games

East Asian Games

*Red border color indicates tournament was held on home soil.

Medals by Games

Asian Indoor and Martial Arts Games

Medals by Games

Asian Beach Games

Medals by Games

Asian Youth Games

Medals by Games

Asian Para Games

Medals by Games

Asian Youth Para Games

*Red border color indicates tournament was held on home soil.

Medals by Games

See also
Japan at the Olympics

References